Jiangwan is a station on Line 10 of the Shanghai Metro. Located at the intersection of Zhengtong Road and Songhu Road in the city's Yangpu District, the station began operation on April 10, 2010. It is named after the nearby Jiangwan Stadium.

Nearby landmarks
 Jiangwan Mosque
 Jiangwan Stadium

References

See also
 Rail transport in China

Railway stations in Shanghai
Shanghai Metro stations in Yangpu District
Railway stations in China opened in 2010
Line 10, Shanghai Metro